The 2008 Portland Timbers season was the 8th season for the Portland Timbers—the third incarnation of a club to bear the Portland Timbers name—of the now-defunct USL First Division, the second-tier league of the United States and Canada at the time.

Preseason

Regular season

April

May

June

July

August

September

Competitions

USL First Division

Standings

Tie-breaker order: 1. Head-to-head points; 2. Total wins; 3. Goal difference; 4. Goals for; 5. Lottery
† Rochester deducted 1 point for use of an ineligible player on August 10, 2008

Results summary

Results by round

U.S. Open Cup

Cup bracket

First round

Cascadia Cup

Club 
<div style="float:left; width:47%;">

Coaching staff

Top scorers
Players with 1 goal or more included only.

Disciplinary record 
Players with 1 card or more included only.

Goalkeeper stats 
All goalkeepers included.

Player movement

Transfers in

Loans in

Transfers out

Notes

2008
American soccer clubs 2008 season
2008 in sports in Oregon
2008 in Portland, Oregon